Not for Nothin'  is English jazz bassist Dave Holland's studio album released on August 21, 2001 via the ECM label. Saxophonist Chris Potter, trombonist Robin Eubanks, vibraphonist Steve Nelson and drummer Billy Kilson return from Holland’s previous album.

Background
This is his thirteenth release on the ECM record label, and the third to feature his current working quintet.

As is standard for Holland's releases, the program consists of numerous compositions by the other band members, in this case one each, in addition to the majority written by Holland. The album's longest track "What Goes Around" was re-recorded by Holland in a big-band arrangement on the follow-up album What Goes Around.

Reception
The Allmusic review by Thom Jurek awarded the album 4.5 stars, stating, "This is postmodern poetic singing at its finest. Who said jazz is a dead art form? Let he or she who has the ears to hear, hear; the Dave Holland Quintet is carrying the banner of creative music in the jazz tradition in the 21st century.".

Maurice Bottomley of PopMatters wrote "Actually, the ECM connection matters. If, like me, you associate the label with all that is clever but too contemplative by half, Not for Nothin'  should be a salutary warning to your (and my) prejudices. Make no mistake, it swings, struts and sways in all the right places. And, at every twist and turn, the formidable Holland is there, relentlessly driving the music forward. There is nothing here that will surprise anyone who has heard Prime Directive -- this set's predecessor -- but it is, if anything, more easily confident. The younger players are all improving and their leader is certainly not in decline. As for the material, there have been more distinctive compositions, but everything is handled so well that it hardly matters. Best Jazz Album 2001? -- no, but pretty close. Best Small Group 2001? I don't see why not."

Track listing
All compositions by Dave Holland, except as noted.
 "Global Citizen" (Robin Eubanks) - 11:12
 "For All You Are" - 8:19
 "Lost and Found" (Chris Potter) - 9:27
 "Shifting Sands" - 5:20
 "Billows of Rhythm" (Billy Kilson) - 6:45
 "What Goes Around" - 13:04
 "Go Fly a Kite" (Steve Nelson) - 6:12
 "Not for Nothin'" - 5:54
 "Cosmosis" - 6:11

Personnel
Dave Holland - bass
Robin Eubanks - trombone and cowbell
Chris Potter - soprano, alto and tenor saxophones
Steve Nelson - vibraphone & marimba
Billy Kilson - drums
Chris "Tek" O'Ryan - sound engineer

References

External links

Dave Holland albums
2001 albums
ECM Records albums